Puerto Rico competed at the 2000 Summer Olympics in Sydney, Australia. 29 competitors, 23 men and 6 women, took part in 31 events in 10 sports.

Athletics

Men
Track & road events

Women
Track & road events

Boxing

Diving

Women

Fencing

Men

Gymnastics

Men

Judo

Men

Sailing

Men

Shooting

Men

Swimming

Men

Weightlifting

Women

See also
Puerto Rico at the 1999 Pan American Games

Notes

sports-reference
Wallechinsky, David (2004). The Complete Book of the Summer Olympics (Athens 2004 Edition). Toronto, Canada. . 
International Olympic Committee (2001). The Results. Retrieved 12 November 2005.
Sydney Organising Committee for the Olympic Games (2001). Official Report of the XXVII Olympiad Volume 1: Preparing for the Games. Retrieved 20 November 2005.
Sydney Organising Committee for the Olympic Games (2001). Official Report of the XXVII Olympiad Volume 2: Celebrating the Games. Retrieved 20 November 2005.
Sydney Organising Committee for the Olympic Games (2001). The Results. Retrieved 20 November 2005.
International Olympic Committee Web Site

References

Nations at the 2000 Summer Olympics
2000 Summer Olympics
Summer Olympics